"Up and Down" is a song by Dutch Eurodance group Vengaboys. Originally released in the Netherlands in February 1998, it reached number four in the United Kingdom in November 1998. It also reached number one on the US Hot Dance Music/Club Play chart in 1999. The Tin Tin Out remix of the song was sampled in DMC's remix of Cher's "Believe". The "Wooo!" voice in the song is sampled from "Crash Goes Love" by Loleatta Holloway.

Critical reception
Larry Flick from Billboard described the song as a "sweat-soaked" debut. Pop Rescue wrote in their review, "It's simple – 'up and down, up and down, up…. and down' – not much to remember when you're dancing to it in a club at 3am. Again the thumping beat and bouncy little synth riffs are there, and aside from that simple almost-aerobic exercise set of lyrics, there's not much more to it. This probably played to its benefit, helping to keep it un-cluttered and catchy."

Track listings

Dutch CD single
 "Up and Down" (airplay)
 "Up and Down" (hard and long)

Dutch and Australasian maxi-CD single
 "Up and Down" (airplay)
 "Up and Down" (hard radio)
 "Up and Down" (BCM radio)
 "Up and Down" (more airplay)
 "Up and Down" (hard and long)
 "Up and Down" (BCM clubmix)
 "Up and Down" (airplay XXL)

UK CD and cassette single
 "Up and Down" (airplay mix) – 3:41
 "Up and Down" (Tin Tin Out remix) – 7:48
 "Up and Down" (Johan S. Toxic dub mix) – 6:49

UK 12-inch single
A1. "Up and Down" (airplay XXL) – 5:51
A2. "Up and Down" (Johan's Toxic club mix) – 6:49
AA1. "Up and Down" (Tin Tin Out remix) – 7:48

Charts

Weekly charts

Year-end charts

Certifications

Release history

See also
 Number-one dance hits of 1999

References

1998 singles
1998 songs
Jive Records singles
Positiva Records singles
Songs written by Dennis van den Driesschen
Songs written by Wessel van Diepen
Vengaboys songs